The Oslo Accords are a pair of agreements between Israel and the Palestine Liberation Organization (PLO): the Oslo I Accord, signed in Washington, D.C., in 1993; and the Oslo II Accord, signed in Taba, Egypt, in 1995. They marked the start of the Oslo process, a peace process aimed at achieving a peace treaty based on Resolution 242 and Resolution 338 of the United Nations Security Council, and at fulfilling the "right of the Palestinian people to self-determination". The Oslo process began after secret negotiations in Oslo, Norway, resulting in both the recognition of Israel by the PLO and the recognition by Israel of the PLO as the representative of the Palestinian people and as a partner in bilateral negotiations.

Among the notable outcomes of the Oslo Accords was the creation of the Palestinian National Authority, which was tasked with the responsibility of conducted limited Palestinian self-governance over parts of the West Bank and the Gaza Strip; and the international acknowledgement of the PLO as Israel's partner in permanent-status negotiations about any remaining issues revolving around the Israeli–Palestinian conflict. Bilateral dialogue stems from questions related to the international border between Israel and a future Palestinian state: negotiations for this subject are centred around Israeli settlements, the status of Jerusalem, Israel's maintenance of control over security following the establishment of Palestinian autonomy, and the Palestinian right of return. The Oslo Accords did not create a definite Palestinian state.

A large portion of the Palestinian population, including various Palestinian militant groups, staunchly opposed the Oslo Accords; Palestinian-American philosopher Edward Said described them as a "Palestinian Versailles".

The Oslo process 
The Oslo process is the "peace process" that started in 1993 with secret talks between Israel and the PLO. It became a cycle of negotiations, suspension, mediation, restart of negotiations and suspension again. A number of agreements were reached, until the Oslo process ended after the failure of the Camp David Summit in 2000 and the outbreak of the Second Intifada.

During the Second Intifada, the Roadmap for Peace was introduced, which explicitly aimed at a two-state solution and the establishment of an independent Palestinian state. The Roadmap, however, soon entered a cycle similar to the Oslo process, but without producing any agreement.

Background 
The Oslo Accords are based on the 1978 Camp David Accords and show therefore considerable similarity with those Accords. The Camp David's "Framework for Peace in the Middle East" envisioned autonomy for the local, and only for the local, (Palestinian) inhabitants of West Bank and Gaza. At the time, there lived some 7,400 settlers in the West Bank (excluding East Jerusalem), and 500 in Gaza, with the number in the West Bank, however, rapidly growing. As Israel regarded the PLO a terrorist organisation, it refused to talk with the sole representative of the Palestinian people. Instead, Israel preferred to negotiate with Egypt and Jordan, and "elected representatives of the inhabitants of the West Bank and Gaza".

While the final goal in Camp David was a "peace treaty between Israel and Jordan, taking into account the agreement reached in the final status of the West Bank and Gaza", the Oslo negotiations were directly between Israel and the PLO and aimed at a peace treaty directly between these groups. The Oslo Accords, like the 1978 Camp David Accords, merely aimed at an interim agreement that allowed first steps. This was intended to be followed by negotiation of a complete settlement within five years. When, however, an Israel–Jordan peace treaty was concluded on 26 October 1994, it was without the Palestinians.

Negotiation partners

Mutual recognition of sides
Only after Israel's acceptance of the PLO as negotiation partner could serious negotiations start. In their Letters of Mutual Recognition of 9 September 1993, days before the signing of the Oslo I Accord, each party agreed to accept the other as a negotiation partner. The PLO recognized the State of Israel. Israel recognized the PLO as "the representative of the Palestinian people"; no more, no less.

Principal participants
Palestine Liberation Organization
Yasser Arafat – PLO leader during the Oslo peace process
Ahmed Qurei (a.k.a. Abu Ala) – PLO negotiator during the Oslo peace process

Israel
Yossi Beilin – Israeli negotiator during the Oslo peace process
Yair Hirschfeld – Israeli negotiator during the Oslo peace process
Shimon Peres – Israeli Foreign Minister during the Oslo peace process
Ron Pundak – formed first Israeli negotiating team with Hirschfeld, before official Israeli involvement
Yitzhak Rabin – Israeli Prime Minister during the Oslo peace process
Uri Savir – former Director General of the Israeli Foreign Ministry, head of the Israeli negotiating team

Norway (facilitating)
Jan Egeland – Norwegian Deputy Foreign Minister, provided political cover, facilities and finances for the negotiations
Johan Jørgen Holst – Norwegian Minister of Foreign Affairs
Terje Rød-Larsen – Norwegian facilitator during the negotiations
Mona Juul – Norwegian facilitator during the negotiations

Outline of the peace plan 

Stated goals of the Oslo Accords were among other things, Palestinian interim Self-Government (not the Palestinian Authority (PA), but the Palestinian Legislative Council) and a permanent settlement of unresolved issues within five years, based on Security Council Resolutions 242 and 338. Although the agreements recognize the Palestinian "legitimate and political rights," they remain silent about their fate after the interim period. The Oslo Accords neither define the nature of the post-Oslo Palestinian self-government and its powers and responsibilities, nor do they define the borders of the territory it eventually would govern.

A core issue of the Oslo Accords was the withdrawal of the Israeli military from Palestinian territories. The plan was a withdrawal in phases and a simultaneous transfer of responsibilities to the Palestinian authorities for maintaining security. Oslo II, Article X.2 reads:

"Further redeployments of Israeli military forces to specified military locations will commence after the inauguration of the Council and will be gradually implemented commensurate with the assumption of responsibility for public order and internal security by the Palestinian Police ..."

And Article XI.2.e:

"During the further redeployment phases to be completed within 18 months from the date of the inauguration of the Council, powers and responsibilities relating to territory will be transferred gradually to Palestinian jurisdiction that will cover West Bank and Gaza Strip territory, except for the issues that will be negotiated in the permanent status negotiations."

The first phase included the withdrawal from the Areas A and B. Redeployments from Area C would follow in subsequent phases. Article XI.3 states:

"″Area C″ means areas of the West Bank outside Areas A and B, which, except for the issues that will be negotiated in the permanent status negotiations, will be gradually transferred to Palestinian jurisdiction in accordance with this Agreement."

The issues that will be negotiated, according to Article XVII.1, are:

"Jerusalem, settlements, specified military locations, Palestinian refugees, borders, foreign relations and Israelis; and ... powers and responsibilities not transferred to the Council."

By excluding Jerusalem and the settlements from the areas to be transferred to the Palestinians, Israeli presence, including the military to protect them, would not change without a negotiated agreement. The Accords also preserve Israel's exclusive control of the borders, the airspace and the territorial Gaza waters. Oslo II, Article XII:

"In order to guarantee public order and internal security for the Palestinians of the West Bank and the Gaza Strip, the Council shall establish a strong police force as set out in Article XIV below. Israel shall continue to carry the responsibility for defense against external threats, including the responsibility for protecting the Egyptian and Jordanian borders, and for defense against external threats from the sea and from the air, as well as the responsibility for overall security of Israelis and Settlements, for the purpose of safeguarding their internal security and public order, and will have all the powers to take the steps necessary to meet this responsibility."

The first step was a partial Israeli withdrawal from Gaza and Jericho and transfer of some powers and responsibilities on civil matters to the interim Palestinian Authority. All to agree upon within two months from October 1993 (Oslo I, Annex II).

Then, Israeli troops to withdraw from populated Palestinian areas to pave the way for Palestinian elections to establish the council. The council would replace the PA, and the Israeli Civil Administration in the West Bank would be dissolved (Oslo II, Article I). Further redeployments of Israeli troops would follow upon the inauguration of the council, as detailed in the Protocol, Annex I of the Accord. Article I, 5. of Oslo II reads:

"After the inauguration of the Council, the Civil Administration in the West Bank will be dissolved, and the Israeli military government shall be withdrawn...."

Twenty years later, however, the withdrawal of Israeli troops did not take place, and the Civil Administration still has permanent military presence in more than 80% of the West Bank (Area B and C).

Permanent status negotiations about remaining issues would start not later than May 1996 (two years after the signing of the Gaza–Jericho Agreement; Oslo I, Article V) and be concluded before May 1999 (end of 5 year interim period). A peace treaty would end the Israeli–Palestinian conflict.

Palestinian Authority and Legislative Council

When the Oslo I Accord was signed in 1993, neither a government, nor a parliament existed for the Palestinian territories. The Palestinian Authority (PA or PNA) was created by the 1994 Gaza–Jericho Agreement. Article III.1 reads:

"Israel shall transfer authority as specified in this Agreement from the Israeli military government and its Civil Administration to the Palestinian Authority, hereby established, in accordance with Article V of this Agreement, except for the authority that Israel shall continue to exercise as specified in this Agreement."

The PA temporarily executed some powers and responsibilities until the establishment of the Council. Article I.1-2 of the Oslo II Accord read:

"1. Israel shall transfer powers and responsibilities as specified in this Agreement from the Israeli military government and its Civil Administration to the Council in accordance with this Agreement. Israel shall continue to exercise powers and responsibilities not so transferred.

2. Pending the inauguration of the Council, the powers and responsibilities transferred to the Council shall be exercised by the Palestinian Authority established in accordance with the Gaza-Jericho Agreement, which shall also have all the rights, liabilities and obligations to be assumed by the Council in this regard. Accordingly, the term 'Council' throughout this Agreement shall, pending the inauguration of the Council, be construed as meaning the Palestinian Authority."

The first elections for the Palestinian Legislative Council (PLC) were on 20 January 1996.  The governments elected by the PLC retained the name "Palestinian National Authority."

Transitional period 
The Transitional Period is commonly known as the interim period (Oslo I, Article V) or interim phase. Hence the name "Interim Agreement" for the Oslo II Accord and the term "Interim Self-Government Authority" (Oslo I, Article I). The interim period was designed to bridge the period between the establishment of the Palestinian Interim Self-Government Authority and the Palestinian Legislative Council, and the end of the permanent status negotiations, "leading to a permanent settlement based on Security Council Resolutions 242 and 338" (Oslo I, Article I). The permanent settlement was not defined. The interim period ended on 4 May 1999, five years after the signing of the Gaza–Jericho Agreement.

Article V of the Declaration of Principles on Interim Self-Government Arrangements (DOP or Oslo I) reads:

Transitional Period and Permanent Status Negotiations

1. The five-year transitional period will begin upon the withdrawal from the Gaza Strip and Jericho area.

2. Permanent status negotiations will commence as soon as possible, but not later than the beginning of the third year of the interim period, between the Government of Israel and the Palestinian people's representatives.

3. It is understood that these negotiations shall cover remaining issues, including: Jerusalem, refugees, settlements, security arrangements, borders, relations and cooperation with other neighbors, and other issues of common interest.

4. The two parties agree that the outcome of the permanent status negotiations should not be prejudiced or preempted by agreements reached for the interim period.

End of the interim period 
In May 1999, the five years interim period ended without reaching a comprehensive peace agreement, but elements of the Oslo Accords remained. The interim Palestinian Authority became permanent, and a dominant factor of the PLO. The West Bank remained divided into Areas A, B and C. Area C, covering some 60% of the West Bank, is under exclusive Israeli military and civilian control. Less than 1% of area C is designated for use by Palestinians, who are also unable to build in their own existing villages in area C due to Israeli restrictions. The Israeli Civil Administration, part of a larger entity known as Coordinator of Government Activities in the Territories (COGAT), which is a unit in the Defense Ministry of Israel, is still functioning in full. The Israeli–Palestinian Joint Water Committee also still exists.

At the 2000 Camp David Summit, the US tried to save the Accords by reviving the negotiations. After the failure of the Summit, the Second Intifada broke out and the "peace process" reached deadlock.

Implementation of the Israeli withdrawal 

Following the Gaza–Jericho Agreement and prior to the first Palestinian Authority elections, Israel withdrew in 1994 from Jericho and from most of the Gaza Strip. In accordance with the Hebron Protocol, Israel withdrew from 80% of Hebron in January 1997. With stalled negotiations, further redeployments did not take place. By March 1998, none of the withdrawals had occurred in October 1998, the parties signed the Wye River Memorandum, promising resumption of the redeployments, but only the first stage was implemented. While Netanyahu faced opposition within his cabinet, additional withdrawals were delayed. During the Second Intifada, in 2002, the Israeli military re-occupied many of the areas previously turned over to Palestinian control.

Key agreements 

Key agreements in the Oslo process were:

Israel–PLO letters of recognition (1993). Mutual recognition of Israel and the PLO.
The Oslo I Accord (1993). The "Declaration of Principles on Interim Self-Government Arrangements" (DOPOISGA or DOP), which declared the aim of the negotiations and set forth the framework for the interim period. Dissolution of the Israeli Civil Administration upon the inauguration of the Palestinian Legislative Council (Article VII).
The Gaza–Jericho Agreement or Cairo Agreement (1994). Partial Israeli withdrawal within three weeks from Gaza Strip and Jericho area, being the start of the five-year transitional period (Article V of Oslo I). Simultaneously transfer of limited power to the Palestinian Authority (PA), which was established in the same agreement. Part of the Agreement was the Protocol on Economic Relations (Paris Protocol), which regulates the economic relationship between Israel and the Palestinian Authority, but in effect integrated the Palestinian economy into the Israeli one. This agreement was superseded by the Oslo II Accord, except for Article XX (Confidence-Building Measures). Article XX dictated the release or turn over of Palestinian detainees and prisoners by Israel. The Paris Protocol was incorporated in Article XXIV of Oslo II.
The Oslo II Accord (1995). Division of the West Bank into Areas, in effect fragmenting it into numerous enclaves and banning the Palestinians from some 60% of the West Bank. Redeployment of Israeli troops from Area A and from other areas through "Further Re-deployments." Election of the Palestinian Legislative Council (Palestinian parliament, PLC), replacing the PA upon its inauguration. Deployment of Palestinian Police replacing Israeli military forces in Area A. Safe passage between West Bank and Gaza. Most importantly, start of negotiations on a final settlement of remaining issues, to be concluded before 4 May 1999.

All later agreements had the purpose to implement the former three key agreements.

Additional agreements

Additional Israeli-Palestinian agreements related to the Oslo Accords are:

Agreement on Preparatory Transfer of Powers and Responsibilities Between Israel and the PLO (August 1994)
This agreement was signed on 29 August 1994 at the Erez Crossing. It is also known as Early Empowerment Agreement (the term is used on the Israel MFA website). Superseded by Oslo II.
Protocol on Further Transfer of Powers and Responsibilities (August 1995)
This agreement was signed on 27 August 1995 at Cairo. It is also known as Further Transfer Protocol. Superseded by Oslo II.
Protocol Concerning the Redeployment in Hebron (January 1997)
Wye River Memorandum (October 1998)
Sharm el-Sheikh Memorandum (September 1999)
Agreement on Movement and Access (November 2005)

Security coordination 

The Oslo Accords brought on the security coordination between Israel and the PA.. Military intelligence coordination officially began in 1996. After the Western Wall Tunnel riots, the Palestinian leadership effectively ceased security coordination with Israel, but it was renewed after the signing of the Wye River Memorandum. During the second Intifada coordination was intermittent, and it did not function effectively in 2000–2006. The following years, the security coordination bore significant achievements, and has become a significant factor in maintaining security for both sides. A security analysis presented to the Israeli government by Shin Bet in 2016 praised the security cooperation. According to the IDF, Palestinian security forces were responsible for about 40% of arrests of terrorism suspects in the West Bank in early 2016. Following the announcement that Israel will unilaterally annex territories in May 2020, the Palestinian Authority ceased security coordination with Israel. In August 2020, the annexation process was put on hold following the Israel–United Arab Emirates normalization agreement, and in November security cooperation was restored.

Immediately following an Israeli military raid on Jenin on 26 January 2023 in which 10 Palestinians were killed, the Palestinian Authority suspended security coordination. According to U.S. and Israeli officials, U.S. security coordinator Lt. Gen. Michael Fenzel presented a security plan to the Israeli government and to the PA prior to the raid.  After the raid, U.S Secretary of State Anthony Blinken, at a meeting in Ramallah with President Mahmoud Abbas, pressed for the acceptance of the plan, which contemplates a Palestinian clamp down on Palestinian armed groups. The Palestinians objected to the lack of emphasis on Israel de-escalating and decreasing its raids in the West Bank. Subsequently, on 5 February 2023, Osama Qawasmeh, member of the Political Committee of the Palestine Liberation Organization (PLO), said "The decisions that taken [by the leadership] are irreversible and have entered into force, whether with regard to the relationship with Israel or seeking action at international institutions in light of the unsustainability of the current status quo.".

Criticism

Continued settlement expansion 
While Peres had limited settlement construction at the request of US Secretary of State, Madeleine Albright, Netanyahu continued construction within existing Israeli settlements, and put forward plans for the construction of a new neighborhood, Har Homa, in East Jerusalem. However, he fell far short of the Shamir government's 1991–92 level and refrained from building new settlements, although the Oslo agreements stipulated no such ban. Construction of Housing Units Before Oslo: 1991–92: 13,960, After Oslo: 1994–95: 3,840, 1996–1997: 3,570.

Norway's role 
Norwegian academics, including Norway's leading authority on the negotiations, Hilde Henriksen Waage, have focused on the flawed role of Norway during the Oslo process. In 2001, the Norwegian Ministry of Foreign Affairs, who had been at the heart of the Oslo process, commissioned Waage to produce an official, comprehensive history of the Norwegian-mediated back channel negotiations. In order to do the research, she was given privileged access to all relevant, classified files in the ministry's archives. Waage was surprised to discover "not a single scrap of paper for the entire period from January to September 1993—precisely the period of the back channel talks." Involved persons kept documents privately and refused to hand them over. Waage concluded that "there seems no doubt that the missing documents ... would have shown the extent to which the Oslo process was conducted on Israel's premises, with Norway acting as Israel's helpful errand boy."  Norway played a mediating role as a small state between vastly unequal parties and had to play by the rules of the stronger party, acting on its premises. "Israel's red lines were the ones that counted, and if the Palestinians wanted a deal, they would have to accept them, too.... The missing documents would almost certainly show why the Oslo process probably never could have resulted in a sustainable peace. To a great extent, full documentation of the back channel would explain the disaster that followed Oslo."

Undermining Israeli security
Israeli academic Efraim Karsh described the Accords as "the starkest strategic blunder in [Israel's] history," creating the conditions for "the bloodiest and most destructive confrontation between Israelis and Palestinians since 1948" and radicalizing "a new generation of Palestinians" living under the rule of the Palestinian National Authority and Hamas with "vile anti-Jewish (and anti-Israel) incitement unparalleled in scope and intensity since Nazi Germany." Karsh notes: "All in all, more than 1,600 Israelis have been murdered and another 9,000 wounded since the signing of the DOP [Declaration of Principles]—nearly four times the average death toll of the preceding twenty-six years."

Alternatives to the Oslo Accords 

Although not an alternative to the accords themselves, a one-state solution would be an alternative to the two-state solution envisaged in the accords. This would combine Israel and the Palestinian territories into a single state with one government. An argument for this solution is that neither side can justly claim a state on all of the land. An argument against it is that it would endanger the safety of the Jewish minority.

See also

 Oslo, 2016 drama by J.T. Rogers, premiere production July 2016 in London

Notes

References

Further reading
 Weiner, Justus R. "An Analysis of the Oslo II Agreement in Light of the Expectations of Shimon Peres and Mahmoud Abbas." Michigan Journal of International Law 17.3 (1996): 667–704. online

Israeli–Palestinian peace process
Israel–United States relations
1995 in Israel
Treaties of Israel
Treaties of the State of Palestine
1995 in the Palestinian territories
1995 in Egypt
State of Palestine–United States relations
1993 in Israel
1993 in the Israeli Civil Administration area
1993 in Norway
1990s in Oslo